Ocauçu is a municipality in the state of São Paulo in Brazil. The population is 4,291 (2020 est.) in an area of 300 km². The elevation is 551 m.

References

Municipalities in São Paulo (state)